The 2018 Parramatta Eels season was the 72nd in the club's history. Coached by Brad Arthur and co-captained by Tim Mannah, Beau Scott and Clinton Gutherson, they finished the NRL's 2018 Telstra Premiership in last place, and did not qualify for the 2018 NRL Finals Series.

Summary
For the 2018 season, Parramatta were predicted by many before the season to finish in the top 8 and challenge for the premiership. Those predictions were matched in the opening round of the season as Parramatta lead Penrith 14–0 early on but after a second half capitulation lost the game 24–14.  In round 2, Parramatta were humiliated 54–0 by Manly at Brookvale Oval. Parramatta went on to lose the opening six games of the season before eventually winning their first game of the season defeating Manly 44–10 in round 7.  

In round 8, Parramatta defeated Wests Tigers 24–22 to make it back to back victories for the club. The Eels then went on to lose the next five games in a row before eventually winning their third game of the season defeating North Queensland 20–14 in Darwin in which Jarryd Hayne returned from injury scoring two tries. The following weeks were filled with disappointment as the club came close to pulling off upset wins against top of the table St. George Illawarra only for the club to concede two tries in five minutes to lose 20–18 and South Sydney after leading 20–6 late into the game only for Souths to score late tries and win 26–20. In round 18, Parramatta lost 18–16 to Newcastle with the club being denied a last minute try after it was ruled winger Bevan French had put his foot over the sideline. The following week, Parramatta defeated arch rivals Canterbury 14–8 in what the media dubbed the "Spoon Bowl". 

There were hopes that Parramatta could avoid the wooden spoon as going into the second last game of the season the club sat above North Queensland on the table due to for and against. In what was the retiring Jonathan Thurston's final home game, both clubs needed a win to avoid the wooden spoon. North Queensland won the match 44–6. In the final game of the season, Parramatta were defeated 44–10 by the Sydney Roosters ensuring that the club finished last and claimed their 14th wooden spoon and the Roosters claiming the minor premiership. Before the match, the Roosters needed to defeat Parramatta by 27 points to overtake Melbourne and finish first on the table.

Standings

Fixtures

Pre-season

Home and away season

Players and staff
The playing squad and coaching staff of the Parramatta Eels for the 2018 NRL season as of 16 July 2018.

Transfers

In:

Out:

Controversies

Tony Williams drink driving

On 14 February 2018, Tony Williams was fined $1,000, had his driver’s licence suspended for 12 months, and was placed on a 12-month good behaviour bond after appearing in Parramatta local court for mid-range drink driving. Williams had insisted on driving home when his wife came to pick him up after a birthday celebration at the Albion Hotel in Parramatta on 16 December 2016. His three young children were in the car at the time. His driving was so erratic that members of the public called the police, who discovered Williams had a blood alcohol level of 0.122. "Shame on you, Mr Williams," Magistrate Jennifer Giles said at sentencing. She said the "community does not feel safe with you with a licence; you are exceptionally lucky you did not hurt or kill someone, or yourself." Williams also has handed a 2-week suspension by the club.

Corey Norman drinking fine

In May 2018, Corey Norman was handed a breach notice by Parramatta and fined $20,000 for drinking alcohol and posting pictures of himself drinking on Instagram despite being on the injured list which is against team protocols.  Norman reacted to the fine saying "I take full responsibility, I'll cop it on the chin".

Kenny Edwards contract termination

On May 19, 2018, Edwards' contract with the club was terminated by mutual agreement as the player had been caught by police driving on a suspended licence.  Edwards was alleged to have fled from police after trying to avoid a roadside breath test.  Edwards subsequently failed to notify Parramatta of the incident for two weeks after it happened.  Parramatta released a statement saying "Today, Kenny Edwards through his management company, request a release from his playing contract with Parramatta National Rugby League Club Pty Limited, this release was granted by the club effective immediately".

Tony Williams and Nathan Davis failed drug test

On September 25, Davis and Williams were both terminated by Parramatta after failing a second drugs test.  Both players were found guilty of testing positive for cocaine.  As punishment, the NRL handed down a 12 match suspension and a fine to Davis and Williams.

References 

Parramatta Eels seasons
Parramatta Eels season